What Becomes of the Children? is a 1936 American film directed by Walter Shumway.

Plot

Cast 
Joan Marsh
Robert Frazer
Natalie Moorhead
Glen Boles
Claudia Dell
Niles Welch
Barbara Pepper
Larry Kent
Wilson Benge
Mary MacLaren
Sonny Bupp
Anne Bennett
Gennaro Curci
Franklyn Farnum
Joseph W. Girard
John Elliott
Roland C. Kennell
Anthony Z. Landi
Lee Zahler
Holbrook N. Todd
Frank Paul Sylos
Richard L'Estrange
Jack Corrick
Clifford A. Ruberg
Ray Mercer

References

External links 

1936 films
1936 drama films
American black-and-white films
American drama films
1930s English-language films
1930s American films